is a railway station on the Sasshō Line in Kita-ku, Sapporo, Hokkaido, Japan, operated by the Hokkaido Railway Company (JR Hokkaido). The station is numbered G08.

Lines

Station layout
The station has two side platforms serving two tracks, connected by a passenger footbridge. The station has automated ticket machines and Kitaca card readers. and a "Midori no Madoguchi" staffed ticket office.

History

See also
 List of railway stations in Japan

References

External links

Railway stations in Sapporo
Stations of Hokkaido Railway Company
Kita-ku, Sapporo
Railway stations in Japan opened in 1934